Studentski Kulturni Centar (abbr. SKC) is a cultural center in Belgrade, Serbia.

History
The center opened in 1971 in the building of the former Officers' Club, that had up to that point been used by the State Security Administration (UDBA). The opening of SKC was seen by many as the communist regime's concession to the youth of Belgrade following the 1968 student demonstrations.

References

External links
 

Buildings and structures in Belgrade
Architecture in Serbia
Savski Venac